Robert A. Gray (September 21, 1834 - November 22, 1906) was a Union Army soldier in the American Civil War who received the U.S. military's highest decoration, the Medal of Honor.

Gray was born in Philadelphia, Pennsylvania on September 21, 1834, and entered service at Groton, Connecticut. He was awarded the Medal of Honor, for extraordinary heroism shown on May 16, 1864, while serving as a Sergeant with Company C, 21st Connecticut Infantry Regiment, at Drewry's Bluff, Virginia. His Medal of Honor was issued on July 13, 1897.

He died at the age of 72, on November 22, 1906, and was buried at the Colonel Ledyard Cemetery in Groton, Connecticut.

Medal of Honor citation

References

External links

..

1834 births
1906 deaths
Military personnel from Philadelphia
Burials in Connecticut
Union Army soldiers
United States Army Medal of Honor recipients
American Civil War recipients of the Medal of Honor
Military personnel from Connecticut